Maddalena is an Italian female given name derived from Saint Mary Magdalene. It may refer to:

Churches
Santa Maria Maddalena in Rome
La Maddalena, Venice

Localities
La Maddalena, a commune in Sardinia, Italy
Maddalena (Genoa), a neighborhood in Genoa, Italy
Maddalena Archipelago, a group of islands in the Strait of Bonifacio
Maddalena Pass, a pass in the Alps
Monte Maddalena, a mountain in Lombardy, Italy

People
Maddalena Allegranti (1754–1829), Italian opera singer
Maddalena di Canossa (1774–1835), Italian foundress of the two Canossian orders
Maddalena Musumeci (born 1976), Italian water polo player
Master of the Maddalena (fl. 13th century), unnamed Florentine artist
Maddalena, the assistant to anthropologist Charles Godfrey Leland
Giovanni Maddalena, Professor of theoretical philosophy at University of Molise
Julie Maddalena, American voice actress
Marianne Maddalena (born 1963), American Film producer

Film, fiction and music
Maddalena (1954 film), a 1954 Italian film directed by Augusto Genina
La Maddalena (2014 film) a 2014 Italian film
Maddalena (opera), a one-act opera composed by Sergei Prokofiev
 Maddalena, a 1971 film directed by Jerzy Kawalerowicz

Institutions
Maddalena lunatic asylum, an insane asylum in Aversa, near Naples, Italy

See also
 Maria Maddalena (disambiguation)
 Madeleine (disambiguation)
 Magdalene (disambiguation)
 Magdalena (disambiguation)
 Santa Maria Maddalena (disambiguation)